The omnivorous leafroller (Platynota stultana) is a moth of the family Tortricidae. It is found in Mexico and the United States (California, Arizona, Texas, Florida and Hawaii).

The wingspan is about 14 mm. Adults are on wing year-round. There are four to six generations per year in California.

Larvae have been recorded on a wide range of plants, including Albizia, Medicago sativa, Amaranthus, Malus, Aster, Persea americana, Phaseolus, Rubus, Vigna unguiculata, Dianthus caryophyllus, Apium graveolens, Trifolium, Beta vulgaris, Zea mays, Cotoneaster, Gossypium, Ribes, Cyclamen, Chrysanthemum, Eucalyptus, Gardenia, Pelargonium, Ginkgo, Vitis, Poaceae, Packera, Juniperus, Chenopodium album, Citrus x limon, Malva, Citrus, Mentha, Prunus persica, Arachis, Pyrus, Capsicum, Pinus, Ambrosia, Rosa, Portulaca grandiflora, Citrus maxima, Sorghum bicolor, Glycine max, Citharexylum spinosum, Actinidia arguta, Solanum lycopersicum, Juglans regia, and Taxus. It is considered a serious pest of greenhouse plants and vineyards. Feeding damage to grape leads to bunch-rot, resulting in crop losses amounting to 80%.

References

External links
 Bug Guide
 Images
 Fact Sheet

Platynota (moth)
Moths of North America
Moths described in 1884